Nicole Arendt and Manon Bollegraf were the defending champions but only Bollegraf competed that year with Jana Novotná.

Bollegraf and Novotná lost in the semifinals to Elena Likhovtseva and Caroline Vis.

Lisa Raymond and Rennae Stubbs won in the final 6–1, 6–7, 6–3 against Likhovtseva and Vis.

Seeds
Champion seeds are indicated in bold text while text in italics indicates the round in which those seeds were eliminated.

 Manon Bollegraf /  Jana Novotná (semifinals)
 Alexandra Fusai /  Nathalie Tauziat (semifinals)
 Elena Likhovtseva /  Caroline Vis (final)
 Lisa Raymond /  Rennae Stubbs (champions)

Draw

External links
 1998 Faber Grand Prix Doubles Draw

Faber Grand Prix
1998 WTA Tour